Log most often refers to:

 Trunk (botany), the stem and main wooden axis of a tree, called logs when cut
 Logging, cutting down trees for logs
 Firewood, logs used for fuel
 Lumber or timber, converted from wood logs
 Logarithm, in mathematics

Log, LOG or LoG may also refer to:

Arts, entertainment and media
 Log (magazine), an architectural magazine
 The Log, a boating and fishing newspaper published by the Duncan McIntosh Company
 Lamb of God (band) or LoG, an American metal band
 The Log, an electric guitar by Les Paul
 Log, a fictional product in The Ren & Stimpy Show
 The League of Gentlemen or LoG, a British comedy show.

Places
 Log, Russia, the name of several places
 Log, Slovenia, the name of several places

Science and mathematics 
Logarithm, a mathematical function
 Log file, a computer file in which events are recorded
 Laplacian of Gaussian or LoG, an algorithm used in digital image processing

Other uses
 Logbook, or log, a record of important events in the operation of a ship
 Chip log, or log, a tool used to estimate vessel speed
 Log (unit), unit of volume in the Bible and Jewish law

See also